This article is a list of results of the 2005 World Series of Poker (WSOP) with statistics, final table results and payouts.

Results

Event 1: $500 Casino Employee's No Limit Hold'em

June 2, 2005

This event kicked off the 2005 WSOP. It was a $500 buy-in no limit Texas hold 'em tournament reserved for casino employees that work in Nevada.

 Number of buy-ins: 662
 Total Prize Pool: $297,900
 Number of Payouts: 63

Event 2: $1,500 No-Limit Texas Hold'em

June 3, 2005

 Number of buy-ins: 2,305
 Total Prize Pool: $3,180,900
 Number of Payouts: 200

Event 3: $1,500 Pot-Limit Hold'em

June 4, 2005

 Number of buy-ins: 1,071
 Total Prize Pool: $1,477,980
 Number of Payouts: 100

Event 4: $1,500 Limit Hold 'em

June 5, 2005

 Number of buy-ins: 1,049
 Total Prize Pool: $1,447,620
 Number of Payouts: 100

Event 5: $1,500 Omaha High-Low 8/OB

June 6, 2005

 Number of buy-ins: 699
 Total Prize Pool: $964,620
 Number of Payouts: 63

Event 6: $2,500 No-Limit Hold'em (Six-Handed)

June 7, 2005

 Number of buy-ins: 548
 Total Prize Pool: $1,260,400
 Number of Payouts: 66

Event 7: $1,000 No-limit Hold'em  w/Rebuys

June 8, 2005

 Number of buy-ins: 826
 Number of rebuys: 1,495
 Total Prize Pool: $2,201,630
 Number of Payouts: 72

Event 8: $1,500 Seven Card Stud

June 9, 2005

 Number of buy-ins: 472
 Total Prize Pool: $651,360
 Number of Payouts: 40

Event 9: $2,000 No Limit Hold'em

June 10, 2005

 Number of buy-ins: 1403
 Total Prize Pool: $2,581,520
 Number of Payouts: 140

Event 10: $2,000 Limit Hold'em

June 11, 2005

 Number of buy-ins: 569
 Total Prize Pool: $1,046,940
 Number of Payouts: 54

Event 11: $2,000 Pot Limit Hold'em

June 12, 2005

 Number of buy-ins: 540
 Total Prize Pool: $993,600
 Number of Payouts: 45

Event 12: $2,000 Pot Limit Omaha w/Rebuys

June 13, 2005

 Number of buy-ins: 212
 Number of rebuys: 395
 Total Prize Pool: $1,156,350
 Number of Payouts: 18

Event 13: $5,000 No-Limit Hold'em

June 14, 2005

 Number of buy-ins: 466
 Total Prize Pool: $2,190,200
 Number of Payouts: 45

Event 14: $1000 Seven Card Stud High-Low 8/OB

June 15, 2005

 Number of buy-ins: 595
 Total Prize Pool: $541,450
 Number of Payouts: 48

Event 15: $1,500 Limit Hold'em Shootout

June 16, 2005

 Number of buy-ins: 450
 Total Prize Pool: $621,000
 Number of Payouts: 45

Event 16: $1,500 No Limit Hold'em Shootout

June 17, 2005

 Number of buy-ins: 780
 Total Prize Pool: $1,076,400
 Number of Payouts: 78

Event 17: $2,500 Limit Hold'em

June 18, 2005

 Number of buy-ins: 373
 Total Prize Pool: $857,900
 Number of Payouts: 36

Event 18: $1,500 Pot Limit Omaha

June 19, 2005

 Number of buy-ins: 291
 Total Prize Pool: $404,710
 Number of Payouts: 27

Event 19: $2,000 Seven Card Stud High-Low 8/OB

June 19, 2005

 Number of buy-ins: 279
 Total Prize Pool: $513,360
 Number of Payouts: 24

Event 20: $5,000 Pot-Limit Hold'em

June 20, 2005

 Number of buy-ins: 239
 Total Prize Pool: $1,123,300
 Number of Payouts: 18

Event 21: $2500 Omaha High-Low 8/OB

June 21, 2005

 Number of buy-ins: 359
 Total Prize Pool: $825,700
 Number of Payouts: 36

Event 22: $1,500 No-Limit Hold'em

June 24, 2005

 Number of buy-ins: 2,013
 Total Prize Pool: $2,777,940
 Number of Payouts: 200

Event 23: $5,000 Seven-Card Stud

June 25, 2005

 Number of buy-ins: 192
 Total Prize Pool: $902,400
 Number of Payouts: 16

Event 24: $2,500 No-Limit Hold'em

June 24, 2005

 Number of buy-ins: 1,056
 Total Prize Pool: $2,428,800
 Number of Payouts: 100

Event 25: $2,500 Pot Limit Hold'em

June 25, 2005

 Number of buy-ins: 425
 Total Prize Pool: $977,500
 Number of Payouts: 36

Event 26: $1,000 Ladies - No Limit Hold'em 

June 26, 2005

 Number of buy-ins: 601 
 Total Prize Pool: $546,910 
 Number of Payouts: 54

Event 27: $5,000 Pot Limit Omaha

June 28, 2005

 Number of buy-ins: 134
 Number of Rebuys: 229
 Total Prize Pool: $1,765,568 Number of Payouts: 9 Event 28: $5,000 Limit Hold'em

June 29, 2005

 Number of buy-ins: 269 Total Prize Pool: $1,264,300 Number of Payouts: 27 Event 29: $2,000 No Limit Hold'em

June 30, 2005

 Number of buy-ins: 1,072 Total Prize Pool: $1,972,480 Number of Payouts: 100 Event 30: $5,000 No Limit Hold'em Short Handed

June 30, 2005

 Number of buy-ins: 301 Total Prize Pool: $1,414,700 Number of Payouts: 48 Event 31: $1,500 Razz

June 30, 2005

 Number of buy-ins: 291 Total Prize Pool: $401,580 Number of Payouts: 24 Event 32: $5,000 Omaha Hi/Lo 8/OB

July 2, 2005

 Number of buy-ins: 224 Total Prize Pool: $1,052,800 Number of Payouts: 18 Event 33: $3,000 No Limit Hold'em

July 3, 2005

 Number of buy-ins: 1,010 Total Prize Pool: $2,787,600 Number of Payouts: 100 Event 34: $1,000 Seniors No Limit Hold'em

July 3, 2005

 Number of buy-ins: 825 Total Prize Pool: $750,750 Number of Payouts: 72 Event 35: $10,000 Pot Limit Omaha

July 4, 2005

 Number of buy-ins: 165 Total Prize Pool: $1,551,000 Number of Payouts: 18 Event 36: $3,000 Limit Hold'em

July 4, 2005

 Number of buy-ins: 406 Total Prize Pool: $1,120,560 Number of Payouts: 36 Event 37: $1,000 No-Limit Hold'em

June 29, 2005

 Number of buy-ins: 894 Number of Rebuys: 1,584 Total Prize Pool: $2,350,020 Number of Payouts: 81Event 38: $1,000 No Limit Hold'em
WSOP Satellite

 Event 39: $5,000 No Limit 2-7 Draw Lowball

July 6, 2005

 Number of buy-ins: 65 Number of Rebuys: 139 Total Prize Pool: $986,860 Number of Payouts: 7Event 40: $1,000 No Limit Hold'em
WSOP Satellite

Event 41: No Limit Hold'em Media
WSOP Charity event

 Event 42: $10,000 No Limit Hold'em Main Event

July 15, 2005

 Number of buy-ins: 5,619 Total Prize Pool: $52,818,610 Number of Payouts: 560 Event 43: $1,500 No Limit Hold'em 

July 11, 2005

 Number of buy-ins: 765 Total Prize Pool: $1,146,870 Number of Payouts: 72 Event 44: $1,000 No Limit Hold'em 

July 12, 2005

 Number of buy-ins: 971 Total Prize Pool: $882,505 Number of Payouts: 89 Event 45: $1,000 No Limit Hold'em 

July 13, 2005

 Number of buy-ins: 758 Total Prize Pool: $697,360 Number of Payouts: 72'''

External links
Official site with complete results
Pokerpages.com results and reports

World Series of Poker results
World Series of Poker